The Terry Hutchens Building is a historic office and apartment building in Huntsville, Alabama.  The seven story structure was originally constructed in 1925 for the Tennessee Valley Bank, with office space rented to other tenants.  In 2002, the upper floors were renovated into condominiums.  The structure is of steel reinforced concrete faced with brick, giving a Gothic Revival appearance.  The ground floor façade has large display windows separated by brick piers, and has a central, arched entry covered in masonry.  The Jefferson Street façade was originally treated the same way, but was modified with a flat wall of thin brick above two storefront entrances.  A decorative band with rowlock course brick and terra cotta panels separate the ground floor from the rest of the building.  Above, the piers divide each bay containing a pair of one-over-one sash windows; on the seventh floor, a green terra cotta frog sits on the sill, between the windows.  Each bay of the cornice is divided by terra cotta decorated with Gothic shapes and medallions on panels of brick.  The building was listed on the National Register of Historic Places in 1980.

References

National Register of Historic Places in Huntsville, Alabama
Commercial buildings on the National Register of Historic Places in Alabama
Gothic Revival architecture in Alabama
Commercial buildings completed in 1925
Buildings and structures in Huntsville, Alabama
Apartment buildings in Alabama